Khorramdeh may refer to:
 Khorramdeh-e Gharbi
 Khorramdeh-e Sharqi